The M119 howitzer is the American version of the British L119 light gun, a lightweight British 105 mm howitzer also used by the United States Army. The M119 is typically towed by the M1097 or M1152 High Mobility Multi-Purpose Wheeled Vehicle (HMMWV), and can be easily airlifted by helicopter, or airdropped by parachute.

Development

The howitzer was designed and produced by the British Royal Ordnance Factories as the L118 light gun. In the L118 configuration, the 105 mm ammunition is cased separate loading ammunition (not semi-fixed projectile and propelling charge as sometimes stated). The L118 entered service with the British Army in 1976 and is used by parachute and commando field artillery regiments. It saw combat during the Falklands War, where the 30 guns in action fired up to 400 rounds per gun per day, mostly at "charge super"—i.e., the most powerful propellant charge available. The L119 is the L118 reconfigured to fire NATO-standard 105 mm semi-fixed ammunition.

In 1987 an agreement was reached to produce the L119 under license by the US as the M119, to replace the M102 howitzer. It entered service with the 7th Infantry Division, Fort Ord, California, in December 1989. The Army renewed contracts for the M119 to be produced by the Rock Island Arsenal-Joint Manufacturing & Technology Center (RIA-JMTC) at Rock Island, Illinois, into the year 2013. The M20A1 cannon assembly for the M119 was manufactured by US Army Watervliet Arsenal.

The M119 is currently fielded with all Regular Army and National Guard infantry brigade combat teams, including those in the 10th Mountain, 82nd Airborne, and 101st Airborne divisions, and the 173rd Airborne Brigade Combat Team. Other divisions may be of mixed composition between armor, Stryker, and infantry brigade combat teams, with armor having M109A6s Paladins and Stryker having M777s for their fires battalions. For example, two of four are IBCTs with M119s in the 25th Infantry Division. National Guard light field artillery battalions assigned to IBCTs also have M119s, for example the 86th IBCT (Mountain) headquartered in Vermont. It is routinely airdropped in airborne operations and sling-loaded under CH-47 Chinook or UH-60 Black Hawk helicopters in air assault operations.

In April 2009, the M119A2 howitzer was being fielded by the 4th Infantry Brigade Combat Team of the 3rd Infantry Division to provide better support in operations in Afghanistan and Iraq. It was the only brigade in the division equipped with it, as the other three brigades were Armored Brigade Combat Teams, and therefore equipped with the M109A6 Paladin.

Alpha Battery of the 1st Battalion, 320th Field Artillery Regiment, 101st Airborne Division received their first upgraded M119A3 howitzers in July 2013, and became the first unit to operate it in theater when they were deployed to northeast Afghanistan in early February 2014. The digitally upgraded M119A3 includes software and hardware component upgrades, GPS for navigation, a digital gunner's display, and digital communication between each gun and the fire direction center to speed up the process of receiving firing data and firing shells. Firing platoons were also equipped with larger, also digital M777A2 howitzers, and the M119A3 was more admired for being faster, lighter, and easier to change azimuth of fire. The A3-model retains manual capabilities of the A2-model, so occasions where digital capabilities were lost allowed crews to easily transition back to the analogue mode of operation and continue their missions.

The recoil system is also being upgraded, as the legacy system had reliability issues with the recuperator, buffer, and variable recoil linkage (which sets recoil length based on elevation); it had a lot of moving parts needing constant maintenance and adjustment during operations with high replacement rates of spares that are complex to manufacture and require specialized tooling to assemble, increasing costs and causing availability problems.

Ammunition

The M119 fires standard NATO semi-fixed ammunition:

 with M67 propelling charges:
 M1 (HE) - High Explosive projectile, range: 11.5km
 M60 (WP) - White Phosphorus smoke generating projectile, range: 15.1km (current variant: M60A2)
 M84 (HC) - Hexachloroethane smoke generating projectile, range: 11.5km (current variant: 105mm M84A1)
 M314 (VL) - Visible Light illuminating projectile, range: 19.5km (current variant: M314A3)
 M444 (APICM) - Dual-Purpose Improved Conventional Munition (withdrawn from service), range: 11.5km
 M916 (DPICM) - Dual-Purpose Improved Conventional Munition (withdrawn from service), range: 11.5km
 M927 (HERA) - High Explosive Rocket Assisted projectile, range: 16.5km
 M1064 (IR) - Infrared illuminating projectile, range: 19.5km
 M1130 (HE PFF BB) - High Explosive Pre-Formed Fragments Base Bleed projectile - range: 13.0km

 with M176 propelling charges:
 M548 (HERA) - High Explosive Rocket Assisted projectile, range: 15.1km

 with M200 propelling charge:
 M760 (HE) - High Explosive projectile, range: 14.0km
 M915 (DPICM) - Dual-Purpose Improved Conventional Munition (withdrawn from service), range: 14.1km

 with M219 propelling charge:
 M913 (HERA) - High Explosive Rocket Assisted projectile, range: 19.5km

 with M350 propelling charges:
 M1130A1 (HE PFF BB) - High Explosive Pre-Formed Fragments Base Bleed projectile, range 17km

The M119 also fires the M395 blank cartridge, which is used for burials, retreat ceremonies, and VIP Salutes as well as to simulate battlefield noise used for training exercises.

Variants

 M119: original copy of the L119
 M119A1: minor improvements, including fire control and maintenance
 M119A2: improved sight package consisting of telescope (M90A3) or panoramic telescope (M137A2)
 M119A3: modernized version with digital fire control system and an inertial navigation system for self location, entered service in April 2013 with A Battery 3/319th Field Artillery at Fort Bragg, NC

References

External links

 US Army Fact Files - Towed Howitzer (105mm) M119A1/A2

105 mm artillery
Howitzers
Artillery of the United States
Military equipment introduced in the 1980s